Centromere protein N is a protein that in humans is encoded by the CENPN gene.

References

External links

Further reading